SATU Konsert Eksklusif Dato' Siti Nurhaliza (referred to it as SATU) is the sixth concert and the eighth solo concert by Malaysian pop singer Siti Nurhaliza to support her thirteenth studio album, Lentera Timur and in conjunction with the Father's Day on 21 June. This concert is her first colossal theatrical concert.

Background
SATU was her first colossal theatrical concert. The name of her concert is a Malay word that literally means "one", inspired by 'Satu Malaysia' or '1Malaysia' introduced by Malaysian Prime Minister, Datuk Seri Najib Tun Razak, a call for unity. The idea for a concert came while she was practising her performance at Anugerah Bintang Popular Berita Harian 08. The concept of this concert was inspired from A New Day... by Celine Dion. More than 30 songs have been performed in full and medley and in new arrangement.

Concert synopsis
The whole concert was meant to portray songs and Siti Nurhaliza's highs and lows after more than a decade of singing and to recap the singer's road to fame. Their concert also had some scenes highlighting her romance with her husband, Datuk Khalid Muhammad Jiwa.

They were more 25 dancers and 20 musicians who were accompanying Siti Nurhaliza throughout the show.

Opening acts
Aizat (26 June 2009)
 Hanya Engkau Yang Mampu
 Fikirkanlah
 Engkau Bagai Permata (Siti Nurhaliza's cover song)
 Heal The World (Michael Jackson's cover song)

Set list
Act 1: The Opening
 Kurniaan Dalam Samaran

Act 2: Medley 1: Ballads
 Tanpa Dendam di Hati
 Dialah di Hati
 Mulanya Cinta
 Hati
 Seindah Biasa

Act 3: Medley 2: Hit Songs
 Sutra Maya
 Jerat Percintaan
 Aku Cinta Padamu
 Purnama Merindu
 Kau Kekasihku
 Percayalah
 Bukan Cinta Biasa.

Act 4: Medley 3: Traditional
 Cindai
 Balqis
 Nirmala
 Bulan Yang Mesra.

Act 5: Upbeat
 Pendirianku
 Ku Mahu
 Debaran Cinta
 Wanita
 Ku Milikmu

Act 6: Siti Zone Fan Request
 Cuba Untuk Mengerti
 Bila Harus Memilih

Act 7: Love Songs
 Siti Situ Sana Sini
 Cahaya Cinta
 Di Taman Teman
 Biarlah Rahsia (dedicated to her media friends who relentlessly pursued her love story back when she was single)
 Destinasi Cinta

Tour dates

Personnel
 Tour producer: Siti Nurhaliza Production
 Tour director: Pat Ibrahim
 Musical director: Aubrey Suwito
 Choreographers: Pat Ibrahim and team
 Costume design & sponsor: Amir Luqman, Michael Ong, Rizman Ruzaini
 Tour Sponsor: Yayasan Nurjiwa, Maxis, Jakel

References

Further reading
 Konsert eksklusif 'SATU' Siti Nurhaliza di IB! (Siti Nurhaliza’s 'SATU' exclusive concert at IB!) Siti Azira Abdul Aziz. mStar (20 May 2009).

External links
  Official ticketing website

Nurhaliza, Siti
Satu Konsert Eksklusif Dato' Siti Nurhaliza
Siti Nurhaliza concert residencies